Horebeke is a municipality located in the Belgian province of East Flanders. On 1 January 2018, Horebeke had a total population of 2,048. The total area is 11.20 km²
.

The Corsele parish in Sint-Maria-Horebeke has a Protestant church which dates from 1872 and a museum dedicated to Abraham Hans (the former Protestant village teacher and story teller) built in 1812 as a parish school. There have been Protestants in Sint-Maria-Horebeke since the Reformation of the 16th century.

References

External links 

Municipalities of East Flanders
Populated places in East Flanders